Jinja–Kamuli–Mbulamuti Road is a road in Eastern Uganda, connecting the towns of Jinja in Jinja District to Kamuli in Kamuli District. A spur of the road extends from Kamuli to Mbulamuti on the shores of the Victoria Nile.

Location
The road starts in Jinja, the largest town in Busoga sub-region. A spur, measuring approximately  extends southwest from Kamuli to Mbulamuti, on the eastern shores of the Victoria Nile. The coordinates of the road at Buwenge are:0°39'16.0"N, 33°10'01.0"E (Latitude:0.654448; Longitude:33.166942).

Overview
This road, parts of which have been gravel surfaced with other parts in various stages of deteriorating tarmac surface, has over the years, undergone periodic remedial repairs to preserve operability.

Due to road's poor surface, the road is potholed and dusty when it is dry. During the rainy season, the road is muddy, gullied and slippery. The government of Uganda has voiced plans to tarmac this road, but without carrying out the task, since 2001.

Upgrade to bitumen surface
In April 2021, Uganda National Roads Authority (UNRA) began the process of procuring a contractor to improve the road to class II bitumen standard, with shoulders, culverts and drainage channels. UNRA views the entire  Jinja-Bukungu Road as one project. However, UNRA will tender the Jinja-Kamuli Road section separately from the Kamuli–Bukungu Road section. Therefore two separate contractors will be hired.

See also
 List of roads in Uganda

References

External links
 Museveni Assures Kamuli on Roads
Government allocates Sh28b for key Busoga roads

Roads in Uganda
Jinja District
Kamuli District
Busoga
Eastern Region, Uganda